Bethel is an unincorporated community in Wilcox County, Alabama, United States.

History
A post office operated under the name Bethel from 1831 to 1911.

References

Unincorporated communities in Alabama
Unincorporated communities in Wilcox County, Alabama